Radford Baird Gamack (1897–1979) was an Australian politician and a member of the New South Wales Legislative Assembly  from 1953 until 1959. He was a member of the Country Party.

Gamack was born in Rollands Plains near Telegraph Point, New South Wales and was the son of a farmer. He was educated to elementary level and became a dairy farmer. Gamack became involved in community organizations in the Kempsey area including the Ambulance Board, co-operative dairy companies, the Kempsey Show society and the Pastures Protection Board. He was elected as a Councillor on Hastings Shire Council between 1923 and 1944 and was the Shire President in 1923 and 1944. Gamack was elected  to parliament as the Country Party member for Raleigh at the 1953 state election. He replaced the incumbent Country Party member Roy Vincent who had retired.  Gamack was re-elected unopposed at the 1956 election but lost the Country Party endorsement to Jim Brown at the 1959 election. He unsuccessfully contested the election as an independent and retired from public life after his defeat. He did not hold party, parliamentary or ministerial office.

References

1897 births
1979 deaths
National Party of Australia members of the Parliament of New South Wales
Members of the New South Wales Legislative Assembly
20th-century Australian politicians